Kazimierz Małachowski of Gryf (1765–1845) was a Polish military officer and a general of both the armed forces of Duchy of Warsaw and the Kingdom of Poland. A recipient of Virtuti Militari for his actions during the Napoleonic Wars, he is best remembered as one of the last Commanders-in-Chief of the failed November Uprising. He assumed command shortly after the disastrous battle of Warsaw.

Polish generals
Generals of the November Uprising
Members of Polish government (November Uprising)
1765 births
1845 deaths
Polish commanders of the Napoleonic Wars
Polish legionnaires (Napoleonic period)
Kościuszko insurgents
Knights of the Virtuti Militari